John Cordts (born 23 July 1935 in Hamburg, Germany) is a former racing driver from North Bay, Ontario. He emigrated from Germany to Sweden at the age of two with his family, and then to Canada when he was in his early twenties.

Cordts participated in one Formula One World Championship Grand Prix, the 1969 Canadian Grand Prix on 20 September 1969. He qualified 19th, but retired his Brabham after 10 laps with an oil leak, while lying 16th.

In addition to his Formula One appearance, Cordts had been successful in Canadian and U.S. sports car racing, particularly with various McLarens run by Dave Billes's Performance Engineering. He competed in many events, ranging from Harewood Acres (where he still holds the track record when it closed in 1970), Mosport, Mont-Tremblant, and Westwood in Canada to various tracks in the US and even Japan. He later became a regular participant in the CanAm series, in which he raced until 1974, mainly in McLarens and Lolas. His best Can-Am finish was second at Road America in 1974. He was also known for his participation in the SCCA Trans-Am Series, where he had, at one point, piloted a BF Goodrich-sponsored Pontiac Firebird, known as the "Tirebird" and also several FIA events with the Greenwood Corvette team.

Cordts has since retired to a private life in Western Canada where he is well known for his beautiful wood carvings and recently wrote his autobiography entitled "Blood, Sweat and Turnips". John was also inducted into the Canadian Motorsport Hall of Fame in 2003.

Personal life
Born in Germany, Cordts grew up in Sweden, before moving to Canada with his wife Inga-Britt and his one-year-old son Jimmy. His two other children, Mary and Johnny were born in Canada and moved to Sweden with their mother.

Complete Formula One World Championship results
(key)

References
 "The Grand Prix Who's Who", Steve Small, 1995.
 "Blood, Sweat and Turnips", John Cordts, 2006.

1935 births
Living people
Can-Am entrants
Canadian Formula One drivers
Canadian people of German descent
Canadian people of Swedish descent
Racing drivers from Ontario
Sportspeople from North Bay, Ontario
Sportspeople from Hamburg
Swedish emigrants to Canada